Ruslan Sheikhau (born June 4, 1977, in Makhachkala, Dagestan ASSR, is a male wrestler from Belarus.

External links
 bio on fila-wrestling.com

Living people
1977 births
Belarusian people of Dagestani descent
Belarusian male sport wrestlers
Wrestlers at the 2012 Summer Olympics
Olympic wrestlers of Belarus
Sportspeople from Makhachkala
World Wrestling Championships medalists